Acupuncture & Electro-Therapeutics Research is a quarterly peer-reviewed medical journal covering acupuncture, electrotherapy, and related subjects. It was established in 1976 and is published by Cognizant Communication Corporation. The editor-in-chief is Yoshaiki Omura (New York Medical College). The aim of the journal is "to make acupuncture and electro-therapeutics a universally acceptable branch of medicine."

Abstracting and indexing 
The journal is abstracted and indexed in:

According to the Journal Citation Reports, the journal has a 2015 impact factor of 0.778.

References

External links 
 

Acupuncture
Electrotherapy
Publications established in 1976
Alternative and traditional medicine journals
Quarterly journals
English-language journals
Cognizant Communication Corporation academic journals